City Creek is a  tributary of the Santa Ana River in western San Bernardino County in the U.S. state of California.

It rises in two forks of similar length and size, West Fork City Creek and East Fork City Creek, in the San Bernardino National Forest. Both forks begin on the crest of the San Bernardino Mountains. It flows south then southeast and finally south again through multiple gorges, picking up several unnamed tributaries. From there it runs south-southwest in a canyon past Fredalba, receiving Schenk Creek from the left near the mouth.

The two forks combine in a steep chasm just downstream of where the West Fork passes under a bridge of California State Route 330, also known as City Creek road. The main stem flows south in a thousand-foot-deep gorge between McKinley and Harrison Mountains, rapidly dropping to the plains near Highland, where most of its flow is diverted into canals for municipal and agricultural usage. Downstream of the diversions the creek fans out into alluvial deposits. Cook, Bledsoe and Elder Gulches as well as Plunge Creek all enter from the left as the creek flows along the east side of Highland in a wide flood control channel. It joins the Santa Ana River to the southeast of San Bernardino International Airport.

See also
City Creek (disambiguation)
List of rivers of California

References

San Bernardino Mountains
Rivers of San Bernardino County, California
Tributaries of the Santa Ana River
Rivers of Southern California